Harl Warren Maggert (May 4, 1914 – July 10, 1986) was a professional baseball outfielder. He played one season in Major League Baseball for the Boston Bees in 1938.

Maggert's professional career spanned from 1932 to 1939. His best season was 1937, when he won the Piedmont League batting title with a .342 average. That October, he was drafted by the Bees. He played one season in Boston and spent most of it as a pinch hitter.

Maggert's father was also an outfielder in the major leagues.

References

External links

Major League Baseball outfielders
Boston Bees players
Rocky Mount Red Sox players
Asheville Tourists players
Oklahoma City Indians players
Baseball players from California
1914 births
1986 deaths
Hollywood Stars players
Sacramento Solons players
Seattle Indians players